Syzygium elegans is a shrub belonging to the Myrtaceae family. Syzygium elegans is found on or beside creeks and streams. Flowers are white, they have 4 sepals and 4 petals. Which is then followed by a white or red fruit, which contains one seed.

References

External links 
 Syzygium elegans at the Plant List
 Syzygium elegans at Tropicos
 Syzygium elegans at endemia.nc (French)

elegans
Plants described in 1999
Flora of New Caledonia
Taxa named by Adolphe-Théodore Brongniart
Taxa named by Jean Antoine Arthur Gris
Taxa named by John Dawson (botanist)